Tando Muhammad Khan railway station (Sindhi: ٽنڊو محمد خان ريلوي اسٽيشن}}) is  located at Tando Muhammad Khan, Sindh,  Pakistan.

See also
 List of railway stations in Pakistan
 Pakistan Railways

References

External links

Railway stations on Hyderabad–Badin Branch Line
Railway stations in Tando Muhammad Khan District